Mayilpeeli Thookkam also called Arjuna Nritham (the dance of Arjuna) is a ritual art of Kerala performed by men of vilkurupp and ezhava mainly and is prevalent in the Bhagavathy temples of south Kerala, mainly in [Kottayam, Alappuzha  districts.  In the epic Mahabharatha, Arjuna was the most valiant of the five heroic brothers, the Pandavas, and was also a renowned singer and dancer and is said to have propitiated goddess Bhadrakali by a devotional presentation.

Arjuna nritham is also called "Mayilpeeli Thookkam" as the costume includes a characteristic garment made of mayilppeeli (peacock feathers). This garment is worn around the waist in a similar fashion as the "uduthukettu" of Kathakali. The various dance movements are closely similar to Kalarippayattu techniques. The dance in mayilpeelithookkam is known as Pyattu.The performers have their faces painted green and wear distinctive headgears.  The all night performance of the dance form is usually presented solo or in pairs.

The strictly rhythm based songs  called as "Kavithangal" and deal with various themes of the Puranas (ancient Hindu scriptures). Each "Kavitham" is composed to suit a specific rhythm.  Before each song, the dancers explain the intricacies of the particular rhythm about to be employed and how this rhythm is translated into dance movements. Percussion instruments like the chenda, talachenda and ilathalam (cymbal) form the musical accompaniment.

References

2.Mayilpeelithookam (Arjuna nritham) Thalaperumayute kala Sajaneev Ithithanam (spcs2016)

See also

 Classical Indian dance
 Arts of Kerala

Theatre in India
Performing arts in India
Dances of Kerala
Classical dance genres of India
Arts of Kerala